The Big Sandy Milling Company, in Louisa, Kentucky was listed on the National Register of Historic Places in 1988.

It has also been known as the Louisa Supply Company, the Louisa Flour & Feed Co., and as Louisa Milling Company. It was located on Pike St. between Lock Ave. and railroad tracks.

It was a three-story post-and-beam structure with a full basement.

It was deemed significant as it probably was Louisa's oldest extant industrial and commercial establishment and it had "reinforced Louisa's regional status as a trade town, as it would bring area farmers here to trade their grain or to get it processed", and it was "a rare example of post and beam/mortise and tenon construction of such a large building for Eastern Kentucky."

The building appears to have been demolished by 2014.

References

National Register of Historic Places in Lawrence County, Kentucky
Industrial buildings completed in 1840
1840 establishments in Kentucky
Former buildings and structures in Kentucky
Grinding mills on the National Register of Historic Places
Industrial buildings and structures on the National Register of Historic Places in Kentucky
Grinding mills in Kentucky
Louisa, Kentucky
Agricultural buildings and structures on the National Register of Historic Places in Kentucky
Demolished but still listed on the National Register of Historic Places